Highland Presbyterian Church is a Presbyterian church located in Louisville, Kentucky, US. The church was founded in 1873 with a meeting in a local physician's home; the current sanctuary was built in 1888. The church is one of the most prominent in the city of Louisville and sends many missionaries abroad every year. The headquarters of the Presbyterian Church is in Louisville and so, in recent years, Highland has taken on a bigger role in national ministry. 
Former Pastor Cynthia Campbell was an outspoken advocate for social justice issues in the city and has contributed her thoughts on the topic in The Courier-Journal.

References

External links
 Official Website

Buildings and structures in Louisville, Kentucky
Churches in Kentucky
Presbyterian churches in Kentucky
Churches in Jefferson County, Kentucky